The 2010 WGC-Accenture Match Play Championship was a golf tournament held February  at the Ritz-Carlton Golf Club at Dove Mountain in Marana, Arizona, northwest of Tucson. It was the 12th WGC-Accenture Match Play Championship and the first of four World Golf Championships held in 2010.

Ian Poulter won his first of two WGC victories with a 4 & 2 win over runner-up Paul Casey in the final match. This was the last year the final was played at 36 holes; it was reduced to 18 holes in 2011.

Past champions in the field

Brackets
The championship was a single elimination match play event. The field consisted of the top 64 players available from the Official World Golf Rankings as of the February 7 ranking, seeded according to the rankings. Tiger Woods, world number 1, and Phil Mickelson, number 3, did not play. They were replaced by Chris Wood (ranked 65) and Ross McGowan (ranked 66).

Bobby Jones bracket

Ben Hogan bracket

Gary Player bracket

Sam Snead bracket

Final Four

Breakdown by country

Prize money breakdown

References

External links
 Official site
 Coverage on the European Tour's official site

WGC Match Play
Golf in Arizona
WGC-Accenture Match Play Championship
WGC-Accenture Match Play Championship
WGC-Accenture Match Play Championship